Nenad Lalović (born on 21 August 1958, in Belgrade) is a Serbian businessman. He has been a member of the International Olympic Committee (IOC) since 2015.

Education
He attended schools in Tunisia, Yugoslavia and Belgium and received his high school diploma in Geneva, where he then went on to study in Belgrade and received his diploma in Mechanical engineering from the University of Novi Sad.

Career
Lalović was the manager of a travel agency and representative of various travel agencies on the Dalmatian coast in Croatia, as well as the manager of a rental car company. He founded a natural Shampoo company around 1995 when he moved to Russia to work in a construction company, where he is still an active partner.

Sports career
On 18 May 2013, Lalović was appointed the position of President of the Serbian Wrestling Federation to serve the final two-years remaining from President Raphaël Martinetti after his resignation.
In 2014, he became the President of United World Wrestling, which revolves around the two Olympic disciplines of Greco-Roman wrestling and Freestyle wrestling. Since 2015, Lalović has been a member of the executive committee of the World Anti-Doping Agency (WADA).

Lalović became a member of the IOC in 2015 and was a part of the Olympic Solidarity Committee. That year, he also became a member of the Foundation Board of the WADA. In 2018, he became a Member of the Association of Summer Olympic International Federations (ASOIF) and was also elected ASOIF representative to the IOC Executive Board.

Awards
Lalović has received various Honorary Doctors, including one from the Tashkent State Technical University in Uzbekistan, and one from the Sofia University in Bulgaria. In 2019 he also received one from the university of Nur-Sultan in Kazakhstan.

References

International Olympic Committee members
Serbian sports executives and administrators
Serbian wrestlers
Serbian businesspeople
Serbian people
People from Belgrade
1958 births

Living people
University of Novi Sad alumni
Tashkent State Technical University alumni